Pancit buko (Tagalog "young coconut noodles"; also known as pancit butong in Visayan), is a Filipino dish made from very thin strips of young coconut (buko) meat  with various spices, vegetables, and meat or seafood. It is a type of Filipino noodle dish (pancit), even though it does not usually use actual noodles.

The recipes can vary and are often adaptations of other Filipino pancit dishes. It has two main types, a broth version, and a stir-fried (guisado) version. The latter often uses latik and coconut oil derived from coconut  cream (kakang gata). Pancit buko is commonly served directly on an opened coconut shell.

The dish originates independently from the Tagalog people (specifically from Quezon and Laguna), and the Visayan people. The Visayan versions of the dish differ from the Tagalog versions in that it sometimes includes wheat noodles.

See also
 Batchoy
 Cuisine of the Philippines
 Ginataan
 List of coconut dishes

References

Philippine soups
buko
Noodle soups